The Bishop of the Falkland Islands was historically a bishopric in the Church of England; as the ordinary of the Diocese of the Falkland Islands, the bishop had responsibility for chaplaincies across South America, before national metropolitical provinces were formed.

Today the Bishop of the Falkland Islands is the head of the small extra-provincial Church of the Falkland Islands, a member church of the Anglican Communion. The title is held concurrently and ex officio by the Archbishop of Canterbury, whose jurisdiction is delegated to a commissary known as the Bishop for the Falkland Islands.

History
Waite Stirling, a missionary from the Patagonian Missionary Society (renamed the South American Missionary Society in 1868) was consecrated in Westminster Abbey on 21 December 1869, as the first Bishop of the Falkland Islands. Stirling had episcopal jurisdiction over "the whole of South America with the exception of British Guiana". Stirling served the people of the Falkland Islands for 30 years, later becoming Canon of Wells Cathedral.

Until well into the twentieth century, the Bishop of the Falkland Islands had episcopal authority over the whole of South America, until power shifted to the Bishop of Argentina. In 1982 as a result of the Falklands War, the Argentinian episcopal authority over the Falkland Islands was abolished; today the Rector of the Cathedral reports directly to the Archbishop of Canterbury and receives pastoral guidance from the Archbishop's Commissary, who since September 2021 has been Jonathan Clark, a former Bishop of Croydon. The Archbishop retains the title Bishop of the Falkland Islands, while his Commissary takes the title Bishop for the Falkland Islands.

List of holders

Bishop of the Falkland Islands

Bishop for the Falkland Islands

See also

Parish of the Falkland Islands
Christ Church Cathedral (Falkland Islands)
Norwegian Anglican Church, Grytviken

References

External links
Falklands Info

Religious organizations established in 1869
 
Christianity in the Falkland Islands
1869 establishments in the British Empire